Dylan Page (born March 28, 1982) is an American professional basketball player for Movistar Estudiantes of the Spanish Liga ACB.

College career
He played for the NCAA Division I Milwaukee Panthers from 2000-2004 where he, along with Clay Tucker, helped the Panthers to their first NCAA Tournament appearance in 2003.

Professional career
During his tenure for MENT BC in the 2004-05 season, he finished fourth in the Greek Basketball League in scoring and sixth in rebounding.

In August 2012, he signed with the Slovenian team Union Olimpija that plays in the EuroLeague. He played in 7 games of the European top competition, where he averaged 15 points and 4 rebounds per game. However, Union Olimpija and Page parted ways due to birth of his first child in January 2013. On February 12, 2013, he signed with the Royal Halı Gaziantep of Turkey for the rest of the season.

On July 24, 2013, Page signed with ČEZ Basketball Nymburk. In September 2014, he signed with Spirou Charleroi of Belgium.

On September 4, 2016, Page signed with Estudiantes for the 2016–17 season.

EuroLeague career statistics

|-
| style="text-align:left;"| 2012–13
| style="text-align:left;"| Union Olimpija
| 7 || 7 || 28.9 || .527 || .417 || .923 || 4.0 || 1.7 || .3 || .0 || 15.0 || 13.1
|- class="sortbottom"
| style="text-align:left;"| Career
| style="text-align:left;"|
| 7 || 7 || 28.9 || .527 || .417 || .923 || 4.0 || 1.7 || .3 || .0 || 15.0 || 13.1

References

External links
Milwaukee Panthers Bio
Euroleague.com Profile
RealGM.com Profile

1982 births
Living people
American expatriate basketball people in Belgium
American expatriate basketball people in the Czech Republic
American expatriate basketball people in France
American expatriate basketball people in Greece
American expatriate basketball people in Slovenia
American expatriate basketball people in Spain
American expatriate basketball people in Turkey
American men's basketball players
Basketball players from Wisconsin
Capitanes de Arecibo players
CB Estudiantes players
CB Granada players
Basketball Nymburk players
Chorale Roanne Basket players
Élan Béarnais players
Gaziantep Basketbol players
KK Olimpija players
Liga ACB players
MENT B.C. players
Milwaukee Panthers men's basketball players
Panellinios B.C. players
People from Amherst, Wisconsin
Small forwards
Spirou Charleroi players